Władysław Orkan (27 November 1875 – 14 May 1930) (actually born as Franciszek Ksawery Smaciarz, changed surname to Smreczyński, but primarily known under his pen name, Orkan) was a Polish writer and poet from the Young Poland period. He is known as one of the greatest Polish writers from Podhale region and Góral folk; the most famous of his works portray the common people from that region.

Biography
Born in Poręba Wielka, Limanowa County as Franciszek Ksawery Smaciarz, he attended the elementary school in Szczyrzyc. He started publishing while in the fourth grade; he also joined many extracurricular clubs and organization, including pro-Polish independence ones. Due to his involvement in such activities, his grades suffered, and he never passed the matura exam. He returned to Poręba village, and continued writing. He debuted in 1896 with a publication of a poem, patriotic poem Nad grobem matki and several satirical verses. In 1898 he published his first work, collection of short stories, Nowele; that year he also changed his surname in to Smreczyński. He published more works soon thereafter: another collection short stories Nad urwiskiem in 1900, a novel Komornicy (1900), drama Postronni (1903), a verse volume Z tej smutnej ziemi (1903), novel W roztokach (1908) and others.

In early 1900s he started construction of a new house; the same building later became the Biographical Museum of Władysław Orkan (Muzeum Biograficzne Władysława Orkana or Orkanówka for short). At that time he also married Maria Zwierzyńska and they had one child, Zofia. Maria died three years after giving birth, and Władysław Orkan, always troubled with finances, asked his sister to raise his daughter. He later married Bronisława Folejewska. During those years he also travelled to Italy, Switzerland, and Germany.

During the First World War he joined the Polish Legions (4th Regiment). For most of his life he stayed in Poręba village. In addition to writing, he was also an activist for the region, cofounder and member of the Association of Gorals. He wanted to a create a single Goral political entitywhich would be called Greater Podhale (Greater Podhale is an archaic term for the Goral Lands and has generally fallen out of use due to it favouring Podhale above all regions) and stressed the ethnic unity of Gorals from all regions. After the war, he continued to write; particularly notable are lyrical poems constituting a cycle Pochwała życia, the drama Widma (1917–1927), the novel Czantoria (1928–1929) and his articles and essays Listy ze wsi (1925–1927). He died in Kraków; shortly before he could collect the 1930 City of Warsaw’s Award for Literature. He is buried at the Rakowicki Cemetery, but next year he was exhumed and moved to a Remembrance Cemetery at Pęksowy Brzyzek, Zakopane.

After his death, many regional organisations were set up under his name, to commemorate his contribution to the culture and prestige of the Goral Lands.

Works
One of the most common image in his works was the poor Goral village. However his works contain other images as well, for example descriptions of mountain countryside and nature, and humorous elements. His early works were inspired by Stanisław Witkiewicz.

Poetry
Nad grobem Matki. Dumania. Kraków 1896
Z tej smutnej ziemi. Lwów 1903
Z martwej roztoki. Kraków 1912
Pieśni czasu. Piotrków 1915

Dramas
Skapany świat. Dramat w czterech aktach z epilogiem. Lwów 1903
Ofiara. Fragment w trzech aktach z r.1846. Kraków 1905
Wina i kara. Tragedia. Kraków 1905
Franek Rakoczy. Epilog w trzech aktach. Lwów 1908

Short stories
Nowele. Warszawa 1898
Nad urwiskiem. Szkice i obrazki. Lwów 1900
Herkules nowożytny i inne wesołe rzeczy. Kraków 1905
Miłość pasterska. Nowele. Lwów 1908
Wesele Prometeusza. Warszawa 1921

Novels
Komornicy. Lwów 1900
W roztokach (tom I i II). Lwów 1903
Pomór. Kraków 1910
Drzewiej. Kraków 1912
Kostka Napierski. Warszawa 1925

Non-fiction
Drogą Czwartaków. Od Ostrowca na Litwę. Kraków 1916
Listy ze wsi (tom I i II). Warszawa 1925-1927
Warta. Studia, listy, szkice. Lwów 1926Wskazania. Warszawa 1930Unfinished
 Czantoria (i inne pisma społeczne). Warszawa 1936Further reading

 Stanisław Pigoń, Władysław Orkan. Twórca i dzieło, Kraków 1958 Józef Dużyk, Władysław Orkan, Kraków 1975 Julian Krzyżanowski, Pieśniarz krainy kęp i wiecznej nędzy. Rzecz o Władysławie Orkanie, Zakopane 1927 Bolesław Faron, Władysław Orkan, Kraków 2004, in Literatura okresu Młodej Polski. ‘Obraz Literatury Polskiej XIX i XX wieku’. S. V. vol. 3. Cracow: Wydawnictwo Literackie. pp. 83-13
 Włodarczyk, J. 2003. Orkan Władysław. In: Słownik Pisarzy Polskich. Ed. A. Latusek. Cracow: Wydawnictwo Zielona Sowa. p. 372.
 Puchalska, M. 1985. Orkan Władysław''. In: Literatura polska. Przewodnik encyklopedyczny. Eds. J. Krzyżanowski and Cz. Hernas. Warszawa: Państwowe Wydawnictwo Naukowe. vol. 2. pp. 110–111.
 Wiktor Weintraub, Review of Pigon's book, American Slavic and East European Review, Vol. 17, No. 4 (Dec., 1958), pp. 576–578, JSTOR

References

External links
 

1875 births
1930 deaths
People from Limanowa County
Polish Gorals
Polish male writers
Polish legionnaires (World War I)